Super Cub may refer to:

 Backcountry Super Cubs Super Cub, an American amateur-built aircraft design
 Honda Super Cub, a light motorcycle.
 Piper PA-18 Super Cub, an American light aircraft design.
 Super Cub, a Japanese light novel, manga, and anime series
 Supercub the lion, a foster lion cub who was adopted from a zoo in Kenya East Africa and became friends with Christian the lion and other lions being cared for by George Adamson.